Portfolios of the European Commission of the European Union now refer to either of: 
 Directorate-General for Regional and Urban Policy
 European Commissioner for Cohesion and Reforms